E. B. Ficklen House, also known as Buckingham, is a historic home located at Greenville, Pitt County, North Carolina.  It was built in 1902, and is a two-story, Queen Anne style frame dwelling with an exaggerated hip roof.  It features a circular corner tower capped by a conical roof, projecting gable, and complicated porch configuration including a first floor wraparound porch with three Ionic order columns.

It was added to the National Register of Historic Places in 1984.  It is located in the Skinnerville-Greenville Heights Historic District.

References

Houses on the National Register of Historic Places in North Carolina
Queen Anne architecture in North Carolina
Houses completed in 1902
Houses in Pitt County, North Carolina
National Register of Historic Places in Greenville, North Carolina
Historic district contributing properties in North Carolina